Lipinski Sound is a professional market and audiophile oriented manufacturer of loudspeakers, subwoofers, powered speaker stands (patent pending), surround sound systems, power amplifiers, microphones, and microphone preamplifiers.

Background
The company was established by Andrew Lipinski. He is an audio engineer and producer of Polish origin, educated in Europe, based in the United States, and professionally active around the globe. The U.S. National Institute of Standards and Technology recognized Andrew Lipinski’s outstanding hearing abilities. He was the only individual to receive a 100% score on evaluation of phonographic recording, rated 1:1000 chance among pro audio professionals.

The company is unique in the industry in that its founder is professionally active in the recording arts, as well as in the engineering sciences. An example of his work was reviewed by Stereophile Magazine that rated Andrew Lipinski’s Super Audio CD (SACD) among 75 best surround recordings ever made, saying: "It is a phenomenal demo, both on its own and as proof of how, without any gimmicks, multichannel can improve on two-channel stereo. A great audio and a great musical experience."

Hardware

Home theater
Lipinski Sound developed a complete solution for High Definition surround sound: a fully integrated, time aligned, tri-amplified system.

 Satellite loudspeakers: sealed, two-way MTM design with patented diffraction control, time-aligned, low-order crossover, ready for bi-amplification. Runner-up for "Product of the Year" in Stereophile magazine; Recommended Components list Class A.  Six exemplary reviews in worldwide audio press.
 Monblock amplifiers: dual topology, biamplification or bridge mode, one-of-a-kind accuracy and dynamics, also beating cost-no-object designs. Built-in high-pass filters precisely tuning and integrating the whole system.
 Subwoofer: sealed, unique double wall, double voice coil driver working in parallel to enhance damping factor.
 Subwoofer amplifier: unique for its 150-Ampere current capability, dual topology, parallel mode, with built-in low-pass filter, precisely integrating subwoofer with components within the monitoring system.
The "Lipinski Surround Solution" is time aligned, from tweeter to mid-woofer down to subwoofer, an issue often neglected by the audio industry. Imprecise time-alignment is responsible for a major degradation in the quality of sound reproduction.

Pro-audio
Lipinski Sound developed analog front-end system for professional recording studios:
 Microphone preamplifier: a preamplifier exceeding the performance of vintage classics, as well as modern designs. PAR Excellence Award; Reviewer’s Choice by Pro Audio Review;  Distinguished performance at 3DAudio shootout in Nashville.
 Microphone — a unique transformerless vacuum tube electronic design, intended to work exclusively with a transformerless input of the Lipinski microphone preamplifier.

Customers
Lipinski Sound professional audio systems and speakers are used in recording and production studios. Since 2006, Dolby Laboratories is exclusively working on the 7.2 Lipinski Sound surround sound monitoring system for their TrueHD Studio in Tokyo. Other clients include engineers for Led Zeppelin, Rolling Stones, Jay-Z, Missy Elliott, Snoop Dogg, Aretha Franklin, Dire Straits, Sheryl Crow, Peter Frampton, Wynonna Judd, Reba McEntire, and Willie Nelson.

Notes

External links
 Review by Larry Greenhill, "Lipinski Sound L-707 loudspeaker", Stereophile, December, 2005, retrieved on September 5, 2007.
 
 
 Mix magazine, retrieved August 7, 2007.

Audio amplifier manufacturers
Audio equipment manufacturers of the United States
Manufacturing companies based in New York City
Companies established in 2003
Loudspeaker manufacturers
Microphone manufacturers
American brands